Robert Otto Homburg (31 January 1876 – 21 October 1948) was an Australian politician who represented the South Australian House of Assembly multi-member seat of Burra Burra from 1912 to 1915 representing the Liberal Union. He resigned in 1915 to devote more time to the legal practice that both he and Hermann Homburg were partners in. He had also been the subject of "gross slanders" about his loyalty, due to their father having immigrated from Germany.

Homburg was an alderman in the Adelaide City Council for many years.

In his twenties, Homburg had been a member of the South Australian cricket team on two occasions. The first was a Sheffield Shield match between Victoria and South Australia played at the Melbourne Cricket Ground on 1–5 January 1897. The second was a first-class match between Western Australia and South Australia at the Western Australia Cricket Association Ground on 3–6 April 1899.

References

 

1876 births
1948 deaths
Members of the South Australian House of Assembly
South Australian local councillors
University of Adelaide alumni
People educated at Prince Alfred College
Cricketers from South Australia
South Australia cricketers